Instrument maker can refer to:

A maker of scientific instruments
A maker of musical instruments
A luthier is a maker of stringed instruments